The Outdoor Relief Prohibitory Order was an order from the Poor Law Commission issued on 21 December 1844 which aimed to end the distribution of outdoor relief to the able-bodied poor.

See also
 Outdoor Labour Test Order

References

Poor Law in Britain and Ireland
1844 in the United Kingdom